Krasny Oktyabr may refer to:


Places
Krasny Oktyabr, Belgorod Oblast, an urban-type settlement in Belgorod Oblast, Russia
Krasny Oktyabr, Kurgan Oblast, an urban-type settlement in Kurgan Oblast, Russia
Krasny Oktyabr, Saratov Oblast, an urban-type settlement in Saratov Oblast, Russia
Krasny Oktyabr, Kirzhachsky District, Vladimir Oblast, merged with the town of Kirzhach

Companies
 Krasny Oktyabr (confectionery brand), a Russian confectioner
 Krasny Oktyabr (steel plant), based in Volgograd
 Krasny Oktyabr (engine plant), based in Saint Petersburg

Sport
BC Krasny Oktyabr, a Russian basketball club, based in Volgograd

Fiction
 Red October (fictional submarine), the submarine in the novel The Hunt for Red October by Tom Clancy and the subsequent film adaptation

See also
 Krasnooktyabrsky (disambiguation)
 Red October (disambiguation)